Widad Amel de Mostaganem (commonly known as WA Mostaganem or simply WAM) is an Algerian Championnat National de Football Amateur football club based in Mostaganem. The club was founded in 1945. They currently play at the Stade Bensaïd Mohamed stadium.

History
The club came 3rd in the 2009–10 Ligue Inter-Régions de football – Groupe Ouest.

The club was promoted for the 2010–11 season for the newly created Championnat National de Football Amateur due to the professionalisation of the first two divisions in Algeria.

Crest

References

External links

Football clubs in Algeria
Mostaganem Province
Association football clubs established in 1945
1945 establishments in Algeria
Sports clubs in Algeria